Florian Roost (born 30 October 1989) is a Swiss former ice dancer. With Ramona Elsener, he is the 2010–2014 Swiss national champion.

Elsener/Roost teamed up in 2005. They began appearing in international junior events in 2007. They were sent to five World Junior Championships and achieved their best result, 14th, in 2011. They also competed at five European Championships and three World Championships. In May 2014, Roost decided to retire from competition.

Programs 
(with Elsener)

Competitive highlights
(with Elsener)

References

External links 

 
 
 Eissportclub

1989 births
Living people
People from Frauenfeld
Swiss male ice dancers